Lower Wage Rural LLG a local-level government (LLG) of [Magarima District] in Hela Province, Papua New Guinea.

Wards
01. Hombola
01. Sebiba
02. Wabal
03. Henep
04. Ombal
05. Songura
06. Solapaem
07. Kapendaka
08. Mabera
09. Weya
10. Waip
11. Mariste
12. Hiri
13. Olaem
14. Posora
15. Yambaraka
16. Wabulaka
17. Olaem
18. Pingi
19. Hone
20. Keme

References 

Local-level governments of Hela Province